Meghna Bank Limited is a bank in Bangladesh founded on 21 April 2013. H. N. Ashequr Rahman, Awami League member of parliament, is the chairman of Bank. The managing director is Sohail R K Hussain.

History 
Meghna Bank was established on 21 April 2013 as a fourth generation private bank in Bangladesh. Mohammed Nurul Amin was appointed CEO and managing director of Meghna Bank in June 2014.

Mohammad Nurul Amin, managing director of bank, said the bank had excess liquidity in December 2015. 

In January 2016, Meghna Bank took 350 million BDT from Bangladesh Bank as emergency cash due to a liquidity shortage along with AB Bank and Farmers Bank Limited. 

In January 2018, operating profit of the bank increased according to managing director Nurul Amin. Adil Islam was appointed CEO and managing director of Meghna Bank in April 2018. The Bank also saw an unusual increase in defaulted loans in 2018. This led to Bangladesh Bank announcing punitive actions against the bank.

Sohail RK Hussain was appointed CEO and managing director of Meghna Bank in 2022.

In December 2021, Meghna Bank was identified as one of the top performing banks of Bangladesh according to the Global Economics Limited.

Meghna Bank received the International Organization for Standardization certification in 2022. Tarana Ahmed, director of Navana Pharmaceuticals Limited, Imrana Zaman Chowdhury, director of Navana Pharmaceuticals Limited, and SM Rezaur Rahman, director of Square Pharmaceuticals, were appointed directors of Meghna Bank. Paramount Textile PLC, a subsidiary of Paramount Group, decided to sell 2,268,400 shares of Meghna Bank, its total shares of the bank, to Imrana Zaman Chowdhury. It donated 20 million taka to the Prime Minister Sheikh Hasina's relief fund.

References

External links

Banks of Bangladesh
2013 establishments in Bangladesh
Organisations based in Dhaka